Crocodylus palaeindicus is an extinct species of crocodile from southern Asia. C. palaeindicus lived from the Miocene to the Pliocene. It may be an ancestor of the living Mugger crocodile.

History
C. palaeindicus was first named by Scottish paleontologist Hugh Falconer in 1859. Falconer found fossils of the species in the Siwalik Hills of India along with the remains of many other animals like turtles, ostriches, camels, saber-toothed cats, mastodons. Richard Lydekker later named another crocodile from the Siwalik Hills which he called C. sivalensis. Although the two crocodiles are very similar, C. sivalensis was distinguished from C. palaeindicus because the margin of its skull was less convex. C. sivalensis has recently been synonymized with C. palaeindicus, as the slight differences in shape are thought to be from natural variation or from fossilization. In later years, fossils were also found from Pakistan and Myanmar.

Classification

Historically, C. palaeindicus was considered a direct ancestor of the Mugger crocodile C. palustris. The two species are similar in appearance, and some fossils of C. palaeindicus were at first mistaken for C. palustris. Most modern phylogenetic analyses of crocodiles place C. palaeindicus in a basal position among members of the genus Crocodylus. Below is a cladogram modified from Brochu et al. (2010) showing the relation of C. palaeindicus with other crocodiles:

A 2018 tip dating study by Lee & Yates simultaneously using morphological, molecular (DNA sequencing), and stratigraphic (fossil age) data established the inter-relationships within Crocodylidae.  In 2021, Hekkala et al. were able to use paleogenomics, extracting DNA from the extinct Voay, to better establish the relationships within Crocodylidae, including the subfamilies Crocodylinae and Osteolaeminae.

The below cladogram shows the results of the latest study:

References

Crocodylidae
Miocene crocodylomorphs
Miocene reptiles of Asia
Pliocene reptiles of Asia
Pliocene crocodylomorphs